Nopah Peak is the highest named mountain in the Nopah Range, a mountain range in Inyo County, California, in the Mojave Desert just west of the state border with Nevada.

While Nopah Peak is the highest named peak in the Nopah Range, the true high point of the range is a point approximately  higher and less than 1 mile south of Nopah Peak.

Nopah Peak and most of the Nopah Range lie within the Nopah Range Wilderness, administered by the Bureau of Land Management (BLM). They also form part of the Basin and Range Province, along with neighboring mountains and ranges, such as the Resting Spring Range to the northwest on the other side of Chicago Valley, and the Kingston Range to the southeast.

Naming 
The origin of the name "Nopah" is not entirely clear. It may be taken from pah, a generic Shoshoni word for water which appears in names elsewhere in the Great Basin region (such as Tonopah and Ivanpah). Gustav Gudde suggests in his California Place Names that the name may have been a hybrid name created by surveyors to indicate no water was to be found there (Nopah→No pah).

See also 

 List of mountain peaks of California
 Old Spanish Trail (trade route)
 Emigrant Pass

References 

Mountains of Inyo County, California
North American 2000 m summits